Mikeius is a genus of wasps found in Australia. Species of Mikeius are thought to be associated with hosts that induce galls on Acacia and Eucalyptus species.

The genus and six species were first described in 2008. In 2011, several alterations were made to the taxonomy of Mikeius. One new species, M. clavatus, was described, and a new subfamily, Mikeiinae, was erected from Thrasorinae. M. neumanni was transferred to the new genus Cicatrix and M. schauffi was transferred to the new genus Palmiriella.

Species 
Currently accepted:
 Mikeius berryi Buffington, 2008
 Mikeius clavatus Pujade-Villar & Restrepo-Ortiz, 2011
 Mikeius gatesi Buffington, 2008
 Mikeius grandawi Buffington, 2008
 Mikeius hartigi Buffington, 2008

Formerly accepted:
 Mikeius neumanni Buffington, 2008, now Palmiriella neumanni
 Mikeius schauffi Buffington, 2008, now Cicatrix schauffi

References

Hymenoptera genera
Insects described in 2008
Cynipoidea